This list of hijackings of Indian aeroplanes is a listing of hijackings or hijacking attempts which have occurred on Indian aircraft.

1970s
1971 January 30 : An Indian Airlines plane on its way from Srinagar to Jammu was hijacked by Hashim Quereshi and Ashraf Quereshi of the JKLF, who took it to Lahore. Zulfikar Ali Bhutto, then Foreign Minister of Pakistan rushed to Lahore and met the hijacker. On February 1, he persuaded them to release the crew and passengers who were then sent by road to Amritsar. The Government of India sought permission of Pakistan to send a replacement crew to fly the aircraft back to India. Pakistan authorities denied the permission, and the hijackers torched the aircraft on February 2.
1976 September 10: Indian Airlines plane Boeing 737 was hijacked from Palam Airport Delhi by a group of six terrorists from Kashmir: Syed Abdul Hameed Dewani along, Syed M Rafique, M Ahsan Rathore, Abdul Rashid Malik, Ghulam Rasool and Khawaja Ghulam Nabi Itoo. Initially ordered to fly the plane to Libya, after knowing that there wasn't enough fuel for that journey, the leader of the terrorists told the pilot Captain B.N Reddy to take the flight to Karachi, Pakistan instead. To refuel the plane, they took permission from CAA Lahore airport in Pakistan to land and refuel. All the passengers and crew on board were duly returned to India the next day, after diplomatic relations between India and Pakistan were re-established and Pakistan helped with the rescue operations. The hijackers were caught in a trick during breakfast, being served colourless tranquilliser with water. All six hijackers were taken in custody and the plane was sent back to India with 83 passengers on board. The militants were later released in Pakistan citing "lack of evidence". Repercussions on the Indian side led to the suspension of 11 members of the security staff and a promise by the Minister for Tourism and Civil Aviation, Raj Bahadur, to order a detailed and "thorough inquiry" into the event "and into the security arrangements at the airport".
1978 December 20: Indian Airlines flight 410 was hijacked mid-air minutes before its touchdown at the erstwhile Palam Airport, New Delhi. The two hijackers, Bholanath Pandey and Devendra Pandey, who were both rumoured to be members of Youth Congress hijacked the Indian Airlines plane on a domestic flight from Calcutta to Delhi. They demanded the release of opposition leader Indira Gandhi (who had been arrested by Indian parliament) and the withdrawal of all the cases against her son Sanjay Gandhi. They also demanded that the Janata party government at the centre give their resignation and leave. Initially the two demanded to fly the plane to Nepal and then Bangladesh, both of which were rejected due to shortage of fuel. Eventually the flight was taken to Varanasi where the flight was landed. It was here that the chief minister of the state of Uttar Pradesh was summoned for the negotiations. After much debacle and discussions both men released the passengers and crew. Their surrender in the presence of media was noted. In the aftermath of this hijacking the Congress party was criticised as a fascist regime. Jarnail Singh Bhindrawale also used this as a point to criticize the hypocrisy of the Indian government even though the government has repeatedly denied its involvement and thus any blame.

1980s
1981 September 29: An Indian Airlines IC-423 plane on flight from Delhi to Amritsar was hijacked by Sikh separatists and taken to Lahore. Pakistan took commando action using its elite SSG, which cleared the plane and freed all passengers.
1981 November 25: Air India Flight 224, a Boeing 707 plane VT-DVB "Kamet" on its way from Zambia to Mumbai, with 65 passengers and 13 crew members, was hijacked when it landed for refuelling at Mahe, Seychelles.The 43-strong team of mercenaries carrying an assortment of weapons demanded that the flight to be taken to Durban where the nightmare of the crew and the passengers ended after prolonged negotiations.
1982 August 4: An Indian Airlines flight from Delhi-Srinagar was hijacked en-route by a Sikh militant with the help of a fake bomb. The hijacker identified as Gurbaksh Singh hijacked the plane, by his own statement as direct retaliation after the Indian government has then asked Sikhs to not carry their Kirpans(Sikh ceremonial daggers) on board. The hijacked plane landed at Amritsar (after being denied permission to land in Lahore, Pakistan). After landing in Amritsar he demanded that he would list his demands only in the presence of then Shiromani Akali Dal president Harchand Singh Longowal and then Damdami Taksal chief Jarnail Singh Bhindranwale, but he later surrendered in front of then SAD general secretary Parkash Singh Majitha. All the crew and passengers on board which included 70 foreigners were rescued successfully.
1982 August 20: A Sikh militant, armed with a pistol and a hand grenade, hijacked a Boeing 737 on a scheduled flight from Jodhpur to New Delhi carrying 69 persons. The militant got on the plane at Udaipur on the jump flight from Bombay to Delhi stopping at Jodhpur, Udaipur and Jaipur. The hijacker was later identified as Manjit Singh an electrician from Amritsar. The militant demanded for the flight to be taken to Lahore but after being debited permission to land by the Pakistani government, it was no longer possible. Due to this the plane circled over Lahore airport more than 42 times before running short of fuel, due to which it was finally landed at Amritsar. Among the various demands that Manjit asked for was 8 Lakh Rupees in German marks, the transfer of power in Punjab to Akali Dal with the position of chief minister given to Prakash Singh Badal and the release of half Sikh security granthis. The hijacker was finally apprehended and shot dead in what was described in a rather "Ham handed" manner. All the passengers and crew on the plane were successfully rescued by the Punjab police and commandos. Peter Lamont, production designer working on the James Bond film Octopussy, was a passenger.
1984 July 5 : An Indian Airlines jet IC 405 carrying 254 passengers and a crew of ten on flight from Srinagar to New Delhi was hijacked and forced to land in Lahore, Pakistan. The hijackers were reported to be armed with pistols, daggers and explosives. The hijackers' surrender to Pakistani authorities ended a 17-hour ordeal for the plane's passengers and crew, who remained aboard the A-300 Airbus in suffocating heat, with little food and water.
1984 August 24: Seven young hijackers demanded an Indian Airlines jetliner IC 421, on a domestic flight from Delhi to Srinagar with 100 passengers on board, be flown to the United States. The plane was taken to Lahore, Karachi and finally to Dubai where the defense minister of UAE negotiated the release of the passengers. It was related to the secessionist struggle in the Indian state of Punjab. The hijacker was subsequently extradited by UAE authorities to India, who handed over the pistol recovered from the hijacker.
1986 September 5: Pan Am Flight 73 Boeing 747-121 serving the flight from Bombay, India, to New York, United States with  360 passengers on board, was hijacked while on the ground at Karachi by four armed Palestinian men of the Abu Nidal Organization. Forty-three passengers were injured or killed during the hijacking, including nationals from India, the United States, Pakistan, and Mexico. All the hijackers were arrested and sentenced to death in Pakistan; however, 4 of the hijackers remain at large. The 2016 Bollywood movie Neerja is based on this event, with focus on the actions of flight purser Neerja Bhanot.

1990s
1993 January 22: Indian Airlines Flight 810 en route from Lucknow Airport to the Delhi-Indira Gandhi International Airport was hijacked and returned to Lucknow. The hijacker demanded the release of all karsevaks arrested after the Demolition of the Babri Masjid situated in Ayodhya and for a temple be built at Ram Janmabhoomi . The hijacker later identified as Satish Chandra Pandey stated his reason for the hijacking, as a means of protest for them Prime minister Narasimha Rao's assurance that Babri Masjid would be remade. The hijacker surrendered after talking to then MP from Lucknow Atal Bihari Vajpayee, former prime minister of India. The bomb he carried was also found to be phony.
1993 March 27: Indian Airlines Flight 439 was hijacked en route from Delhi to Madras by a hijacker claiming to be strapped with explosives. The hijacker was later identified as Hari Singh, a truck driver from Haryana. He stated the reason behind this hijacking as a protest against the ongoing Hindu-Muslim riots at that time in which more than 2,000 people died. He forced the plane to land in Amritsar (after being denied landing permission in Lahore) and demanded political asylum in Pakistan. His demands of a  40-day asylum in Pakistan and permission to speak to Pakistani media was rejected but, was allowed to speak to Indian media at Amritsar airport after his surrender. The hijacker subsequently surrendered and the explosive was found to be a disguised hair-dryer.
1993 April 10: An Indian Airlines Boeing 737-2A8, en route from Lucknow to Delhi, was hijacked by four students of the Government Arts College, Lucknow. The 4 youth commandeered the plane soon after takeoff from Lucknow and forced it return. The 4 students were armed with a bottle which they brandished as containing an explosive. It was later identified as being a combustible liquid capable of a small fire. They demanded changes to the college's courses, cancellation of an award to a professor and postponement of exams. One student narrated a 10-minute litany on their various grievances and demanded that unless they are allowed to meet with the governor of Uttar Pradesh they'll blow up the plane. In the words Tom Segev, an Israeli Journalist who was also a passenger on the flight "The whole thing was like a game." The passengers didn't put much attention to the hijackers and continued to do whatever they were doing. The flight flew in circles for 3 hours, while negotiations were done with the authorities through the control tower. After the flight landed the passengers overpowered the hijackers and successfully got the situation in control. All of the 52 passengers and 7 crew members were unharmed and saved. The hijackers beaten and bruised were handed over to authorities. This was the 3rd attempt on plane hijacking in 1993.
1993 April 24: Indian Airlines aircraft bound for Srinagar via Jammu from Delhi is hijacked. The hijacker wanted to take the plane to Lahore, but Pakistan authorities refused permission. The plane landed at Amritsar where the hijacker was killed and passengers freed.
24 December 1999 - 31 December 1999: Indian Airlines Flight 814, flying from Kathmandu, was hijacked and diverted to Kandahar, Afghanistan which was then in control of the Taliban. After a week-long stand-off, India agreed to release three jailed terrorists in exchange for the hostages. One hostage was stabbed to death and his body thrown on the tarmac as a "warning attack".

See also 
Anti-Hijacking Act, 2016
Air India Flight 182
List of hijackings of Turkish airplanes
 List of aircraft hijackings
 List of accidents and incidents involving airliners by location#India
List of accidents and incidents involving airliners by airline (A–C)#A
List of accidents and incidents involving airliners by airline (D–O)#I
 List of accidents and incidents involving commercial aircraft

References

External links 
 Article at International Institute For Counter-Terrorism

 Hijackings
Aircraft hijackings
India
Aircraft hijackings
Sikh terrorism
Hijackings of aeroplanes
Aircraft hijackings in Pakistan